Shirley Curry (born April 2, 1936), also known by her nickname Skyrim Grandma, is an American YouTuber and gamer. She gained popularity for her The Elder Scrolls V: Skyrim gameplay videos.

Biography 
She worked as a secretary, in a candy factory, and for several years as an associate in a women's clothing department of Kmart before retiring at the age of 55, in 1991.

Curry got into gaming after her son taught her how to play the 1996 turn-based strategy video game Civilization II. In 2011 she joined YouTube to follow gaming channels and in 2015 she uploaded her first Skyrim gameplay video. By 2020, she had over 900,000 subscribers in YouTube. After followers started a petition to include her in the following game of the series the studio creator of the Elder Scrolls franchise, Bethesda Softworks, promised to include her as a character in The Elder Scrolls VI.

In 2022, Curry suffered a stroke while sleeping, forgetting many details of her experiences in gaming. Despite expressing frustration for its impact on her videogame play, she began to recover from the stroke and expressed hope for the future. After the news broke, many of her fans united to wish her good health, and Bethesda Softworks sent her a bouquet of flowers.

Personal life 
Curry is a widow and has four children, nine grandchildren and three great-grandchildren.

References 

American YouTubers
Gaming YouTubers
Living people
1936 births